The Other Nationalities rugby league team are a rugby league representative team that usually consists of non-English players. They have also played under the name The Exiles and more recently Combined Nations All Stars. They competed in the first ever rugby league international in 1904, against , fielding players from Wales and Scotland. The team was later represented by players from Australia, Fiji, Ireland, New Zealand, and South Africa. The Other Nationalities team wore green shirts.

History
The team was formed to play England in one-off friendlies and did so until the 1930s. Between 1949 and 1955, they competed in the European Championship, winning the 1952/53 and 1955/56 tournaments. In 1964 Other Nationalities played their only match in the Southern Hemisphere in a one-off match vs Sydney Colts at the Sydney Cricket Ground. The match was played as a curtain-raiser to the Australia vs France 3rd Test and was arranged in order to boost the attendance due to France's poor form on tour. The team was made up of foreign players from the NSWRL competition that year plus two Frenchmen that missed selection in France's 3rd Test team. In 1965, Other Nationalities also played New Zealand at Selhurst Park as part of that years Kiwi tour. In 1974 and 1975 the team competed in the County Championship, facing Lancashire, Yorkshire, and Cumbria, twice each over both years.

The team ceased to exist after 1975 with Great Britain no longer competing in tournaments meaning  began to compete on a regular basis and  began selecting overseas-based players.

In 2011, the concept of a representative side were resurrected to give England a competitive game without having to travel to the Southern Hemisphere. The team played under the name the Exiles and the game was billed as International Origin. Only Southern Hemisphere born players playing in the Super League were eligible for selection.

Four editions of International Origin were played until 2013 when the game was discontinued due to poor attendances.

In 2021, the Other Nationalities team was reincarnated for a third time under the name Combined Nations All Stars to again give England a competitive game leading up to the World Cup. Unlike previous teams this team also contained other English players.

Results

Player statistics
Source

† 5 April 1904 match, against England, was a 12-a-side game.

†† Although originally from South Africa, David "Dave" Barends also represented Great Britain.

See also
 Exiles rugby league team
 British Empire XIII
 Rugby League XIII
 Rest of the world

References

External links
RL1895 - The First International
France defeated in ‘Battle of the Boulevard’

 
Rugby league in the United Kingdom
Rugby league in England
Rugby league in Ireland
Rugby league in Wales
Rugby league in Scotland
National rugby league teams